Gerhard Mans (born 4 September 1987) is a Namibian professional racing cyclist. He won the Namibian National Time Trial Championships in 2015. He also rode in two events at the 2014 Commonwealth Games.

Major results

2013
 2nd Time trial, National Road Championships
2015
 1st  Time trial, National Road Championships
2016
 3rd Time trial, National Road Championships

References

External links

1987 births
Living people
Namibian male cyclists
Sportspeople from Windhoek
Cyclists at the 2014 Commonwealth Games
Commonwealth Games competitors for Namibia